D6 HDTV VTR is SMPTE videocassette standard. A D6 VTR can record and playback HDTV video uncompressed.  The only D6 VTR product is the Philips, now Thomson's Grass Valley's Media Recorder, model DCR 6024, also called the D6 Voodoo VTR. The VTR was a joint project between Philips Digital Video Systems of Germany and Toshiba in Japan. The tape deck module was designed and made by Philips in Weiterstadt, Germany (formerly Bosch Fernseh), and the digital processor module designed and made by Toshiba. Since there is no data compression, after 20 tape copies of multi generations there is no noticeable loss of quality. As a very high-end, costly system about 70 were sold to high-end post houses from about 2000 to 2005. The VTR had a data record option. The data module could record and play back 2k DPX files at 6 frames per second over a HIPPI connection. The VTR came in a data only model, or with a switch module, so the record deck could be used for both video and data recording. The tape deck was also sold stand alone as a giga bit recorder to record and playback raw data.  Toshiba made the video tape for the VTR. The high price of the video tape limited the use of the VTR.

Specs 

Tape format D-6 19 mm tape cassette housing, SMPTE 277/278M
Also marketed under the name "Digital Voodoo"
The tape cassette housing looks like a 19mm D1 or D2 cassette, but inserting these older standard definition tape cassettes would be rejected by the VTR.
Magnetic tape is a metal particle tape
Scanner diameter 96 mm, a helical scan
Track pitch: 22 um
D6 tape thickness 11 um 
Head to tape speed ~46 m/s
Tape speed ~497 mm/s
Records and playback of 1 Gbit/s uncompressed data—the only real-time uncompressed HD videotape format marketed (the more ubiquitous Sony HDCAM, Panasonic D5-HD and Sony XDCAM HD/422 all used compression)
Uses cassette sizes L – M – S
Recording time:
Small type 8 minutes
Med. type 28 minutes
Large type 64 minutes
Helical scan Record heads 2 clusters of 8 (0/180) total of 16
Play heads 2 clusters of 8 (0/180) Total of 16
Erase heads 2 (0/180) 
Yes, that is a total of 34 heads on the scanner.
Video error correction Reed Solomon code, 2D
Longitudinal tracks three: Control track, Timecode and, Audio cue
 Playback Slow motion +/- ¼ and with a video visible search mode
HDTV Video Signal Formats (SMPTE 274M)
1920 x 1080 @ 24p
1920 x 1080 @ 23.976p
1920 x 1080 @ 25p
Progressive modes  DTV
1920 x 1080 @ 24sF
1920 x 1080 @ 23.976sF
1920 x 1080 @ 25sF ”segmented frame” modes
1920 x 1080 @ 60i
1920 x 1080 @ 59.94i
1920 x 1080 @ 50i 2:1 interlace modes
The unit can cross play some formats
Sampling Frequency 4:2:2: 
Luminance Y 74.25 MHz and 74.25/1.001 = 74.1758 MHz
Chrominance 37.125 MHz and 37.125/1.001 = 37.0879 MHz
Quantization:
Y-Luminance = 10 Bits 24/25 fr/sec modes and 8 Bits 30 fr/sec modes
Chroma = 8 Bits
AUDIO:
30 Frames System: 10 channel, 5 stereo pairs
24/25 Frames System: 12 channels, 6 stereo pairs
Audio standard AES/EBU
Sampling frequency 48 kHz
Quantization, digital I/O 20 or 24 bit

Worldwide past users list 

Europe:

Artisan video,  Netherlands 
Augustus, Italy
Cinefekt
Digital Film Lab, Copenhagen, Denmark
Digital Images, Halle, Germany
Digital Film Finland, Helsinki, Finland
DMV Research, UK 
Eclair Épinay, France
Frame Image, Helsinki, Finland
Frithiof Telecine, Stockholm, Sweden
Generator Post, Finland
Geyer Video, Berlin, Germany
Interactive Group, Milan, Italy
LTC Scanlab, France
Listo, Vienna, Austria
Mars Motel, Sweden
Molinare, Spain
Philips Research, Netherlands
Rudas, Germany
Sertek, Turkey
Short Cut, Denmark 
Epoka Ltd, Poland 
EBH Polska, Warsaw, Poland
Taurus Media Technik, Munich, Germany
VCC, Hamburg, Germany
VDM Courbevoie, France 
Video Copy Company – VCC, Berlin, Germany 
VTR, London
Warehouse, Denmark

Americas

Casablanca Finish Ltda, São Paulo, Brazil
Command Post, Toronto, Canada 
Complete Post, Hollywood, CA 
Discreet, Montreal, Canada
Digital Images, Los Angeles, CA
Galicia Ramirez y Asoc. Mex., Mexico
The Ed Guzman HDTV Museum, Burbank, CA
Industrial Light and Magic, San Francisco, CA
IVC, International Video Conversions, Burbank, CA 
Laser Pacific, Hollywood, CA 
Library of Congress, Washington, DC
Mega, Brazil
Rede Globo, Brazil
Rhinoceros Editorial & Post, New York, NY
SMA Video, New York, NY 
Technique, Burbank, CA 
Vid-Film (now Technicolor Creative Services), Glendale, CA

Asia/Pacific
Noriko Post, Osaka, Japan

Photo gallery

See also
D-3 video
D-5 HD
Spirit DataCine
Magnetic storage
 DVCAM
 DVCPRO
 D-1 (Sony)
 D-2 (video)

External links
 Manual for a D6 VooDoo (PDF)
 cilect.org on Digital Film Melbourne
 digitalcontentproducer.com - video NAB choose weapons
 cinematography.net D6 test
 pmotions.com, PDF file, D6 on page 50
 Digital Fact Book 2008

References

Video storage
Film and video technology
Recording
Computer storage tape media
Audiovisual introductions in 2000